Stacie Hixon is an American attorney and jurist serving as a judge on the Oklahoma Court of Civil Appeals. Governor Kevin Stitt appointed her on March 10, 2020 to replace Jerry Goodman.

Early life and education 
Hixon was born and raised in Owasso, Oklahoma. She earned a Bachelor of Arts and Master of Arts from Oklahoma State University–Stillwater, followed by a Juris Doctor from the University of Tulsa College of Law.

Career 
At the time of her appointment, Hixon was a partner at the Steidley & Neal law firm, which has offices in Tulsa, McAlester and Durant, and has focused on areas that include insurance, product liability, employment law and general civil litigation. She replaced Jerry Goodman, who had already retired from the bench.

Notes

References 

21st-century American judges
People from Owasso, Oklahoma
Oklahoma State University alumni
University of Tulsa College of Law alumni
Year of birth missing (living people)
Living people
Oklahoma state court judges
21st-century American women judges